After Dark is a 1932 British crime film directed by Albert Parker and starring Horace Hodges, Hugh Williams and Grethe Hansen. It was made at Walton Studios as a quota quickie.

Cast
Horace Hodges as Thaddeus Cattermole Brompton  
Hugh Williams as Richard Morton  
Grethe Hansen as Alva Lea  
George Barraud as George Harvey  
Henry Oscar as Higgins  
Ian Fleming as Henry Lea  
Polly Emery as Mrs. Hannah Thirkettle  
Arthur Padbury as Wilfred Thirtkettle  
Lucille Lisle as Vivienne Roberts

References

Bibliography
Chibnall, Steve. Quota Quickies: The Birth of the British 'B' Film. British Film Institute, 2007.
Low, Rachael. Filmmaking in 1930s Britain. George Allen & Unwin, 1985.
Wood, Linda. British Films, 1927-1939. British Film Institute, 1986.

External links

1932 films
British crime drama films
1932 crime drama films
1930s English-language films
Films shot at Nettlefold Studios
Fox Film films
Quota quickies
Films directed by Albert Parker
Films set in London
British black-and-white films
1930s American films
1930s British films
British films based on plays